The 2006–07 Pittsburgh Panthers men's basketball team represented the University of Pittsburgh in the 2006–07 NCAA Division I men's basketball season. Led by head coach Jamie Dixon, the Panthers finished with a record of 29–8 and made it to the sweet sixteen of the 2007 NCAA Division I men's basketball tournament where they lost to UCLA.

References

Pittsburgh Panthers men's basketball seasons
Pittsburgh
Pittsburgh
Pittsburgh Pan
Pittsburgh Pan